Hey Rube! is a 1928 American silent drama film directed by George B. Seitz.

Cast
 Hugh Trevor as String
 Gertrude Olmstead as Lutie
 Ethlyne Clair as Zelda
 Bert Moorhouse as Moffatt (as Bert Moorehouse)
 Walter McGrail as Duke

References

External links

1928 films
1928 drama films
Silent American drama films
American silent feature films
American black-and-white films
Films directed by George B. Seitz
Film Booking Offices of America films
1920s American films